Gentiana puberulenta, the downy gentian, is a branchless perennial plant of the Gentianaceae family native to North America. It is about ¾–1½' tall, with bright blue to deep blue-violet bell-shaped, upright, five-lobed flowers measuring 1½ to 2¼ inches across when fully open. Flowers grow in clusters of 1–8 at the apex of the plant. Lanceolate, sessile, glossy leaves up to  3" long and 1¼" across are arranged oppositely along the central stem, except at the apex where they grow in whorls of 3–7. Gentiana puberulenta grows in dry upland prairies and woods and rocky open slopes.

References

puberulenta
Flora of the Eastern United States
Flora of the United States
Flora of the North-Central United States
Flora of the Great Plains (North America)
Flora without expected TNC conservation status